Fangfoss railway station was a station on the York to Beverley Line in the East Riding of Yorkshire, England. It opened on 4 October 1847 and served the village of Fangfoss. It closed on 3 January 1959 and much of the site is now occupied by a caravan park.

In 1987 the station was given a Grade II listed building status.

References

External links

 
 Fangfoss station on navigable 1947 O. S. map

Disused railway stations in the East Riding of Yorkshire
Grade II listed buildings in the East Riding of Yorkshire
Former York and North Midland Railway stations
Railway stations in Great Britain opened in 1847
Railway stations in Great Britain closed in 1959
1847 establishments in England
George Townsend Andrews railway stations
Grade II listed railway stations